The women's 1000 metre at the 2011 World Short Track Speed Skating Championships took place 13 March at the Sheffield Arena.

Results

Heats
Top 2 Athletes from each heat qualified for quarterfinals.

Heat 1

Heat 3

Heat 5

Heat 7

Heat 9

Heat 2

Heat 4

Heat 6

Heat 8

Heat 10

Quarterfinals
Top 2 Athletes from each heat qualified for Semifinals.

Heat 1

Heat 3

Heat 2

Heat 4

Semifinals
Top 2 Athletes from each heat qualified for the Final.

Heat 1

Heat 2

Final

References

2011 World Short Track Speed Skating Championships